The Muskegon Reds was the primary name of the minor league baseball franchise in Muskegon, Michigan that existed on-and-off from 1890 to 1951.

History
Muskegon played in the Michigan State League (1890–1902, 1911–1914, 1926, 1940–1941), Central League (1916–1922, 1926, 1934, 1948–1951), Michigan-Ontario League (1923–1924) and the Northwestern League (1884).  The franchise was affiliated with the Detroit Tigers (1940–1941), Chicago White Sox (1948–1950) and the New York Yankees (1951).

The team shared their Reds moniker with Muskegon High School.

The ballpark

Muskegon teams played at historic Marsh Field, built in 1916 and named a State of Michigan historic landmark. The park is located at 1800 Peck Street Muskegon, MI 49441. Today, it is the home of the Muskegon Clippers, who revived the previous Muskegon moniker and play in the Great Lakes Summer Collegiate League.

Notable Muskegon alumni

Baseball Hall of Fame alumni
 Bucky Harris (1916) Inducted, 1975
 Red Ruffing (1949, MGR) Inducted, 1967

Notable alumni
 Bud Clancy (1924)
 Buck Crouse (1921-1923)
 Freddie Fitzsimmons (1920-1922) 217 MLB wins
 Alex Grammas (1949)
 Elston Howard (1950) 12 x MLB All-Star; 1963 AL Most Valuable Player
 Doc Lavan (1912)
 Johnny Lipon (1941)
 Stubby Overmire (1941)
 Doc White (1920) NL ERA Leader

Year-by-year record

References

Chicago White Sox minor league affiliates
Defunct baseball teams in Michigan
Detroit Tigers minor league affiliates
New York Yankees minor league affiliates
Defunct minor league baseball teams
Central League teams
Michigan State League teams
Sports in Muskegon, Michigan